Muldakayevo (Muldaqay) is a rural locality (a selo) in Assinsky Selsoviet, Beloretsky District, Bashkortostan, Russia. The population was 192 as of 2010. There are 6 streets.

Geography 
Muldakayevo is located 150 km northwest of Beloretsk (the district's administrative centre) by road. Iskushta is the nearest rural locality.

References 

Rural localities in Beloretsky District